Osteolaemus osborni, commonly known as Osborn's dwarf crocodile, is a species of crocodile endemic to the Congo Basin in Africa.

This species has had a somewhat convoluted taxonomical history. It was first described as Osteoblepharon osborni by Schmidt in 1919, based on a few specimens from the Upper Congo River Basin in what is now the Democratic Republic of Congo. However, Inger in a 1948 paper found the specimens wanting of characteristics that would justify a generic separation from Osteolaemus and referred the specimens to Osteolaemus osborni. In 1961, it was reduced to subspecies rank, but was revalidated to full species status in 2021.

The subspecific name, osborni, is in honor of American paleontologist Henry Fairfield Osborn.

References

Crocodylidae
Crocodilians of Africa
Fauna of Central Africa
Reptiles of West Africa
Reptiles described in 1919